Ratna Kabir Sweety is a Bangladeshi film actress who is known as Ratna in Dhallywood. She acted in more than 50 films.

Biography
Ratna's father M H Kabir is an engineer and her mother Husna Kabir is a journalist. She entered into the film arena of Bangladesh with Keno Valobaslam in 2002 where Ferdous Ahmed was her co-star. After that she acted in Itihas. Her last released film was Sedin Brishty Chhilo which was released in 2014.

Ratna completed BA from Jagannath University in Social Welfare and she completed MA from Dhaka University in Social Welfare too. She collected nomination form for reserved seats for women in Jatiyo Sangsad from Bangladesh Awami League in 2014.

Selected filmography
 Keno Valobaslam
 Itihas
 Prio Shathi
 Moron Niye Khela
 Pore Na Chokher Polok
 Ki Jadu Korila
 Mon Jekhane Hridoy Sekhane
 Ongko
 Noshto
 Mon Niye Lukochuri
 Koti Takar Meye Goriber Chhele
 Rokte Veja Bangladesh
 Pach Takar Ruti
 Dhoka
 Sontan Amar Ohongkar
 Sontaner Moto Sontan
 Time Machine
 Shedin Brishti Chilo

References

External links
 

Living people
Bangladeshi film actresses
University of Dhaka alumni
Jagannath University alumni
Year of birth missing (living people)